The Mod Archive is a web site dedicated to the indexing and archival of playable music module files. It allows anyone to upload modules, and provides charts, reviews and ratings of music files based on a community effort.

Formats covered by the site are MOD, IT, XM, AHX, MED, STM, S3M, MO3, MTM, 669, AMF, AMS, DBM, DIGI, DMF, DSM, FAR, GDM, IMF, J2B, MDL, MPTM, MT2, OKT, PLM, PTM, STM, ULT and HVL.

History
The Mod Archive was established in 1996 as a place for tracker artists to upload their work. Since then, the site has emerged into being a community for artists and module enthusiasts.

In an effort to make the website more dynamic, the community part of the site was added around 2000, in the form of message boards and an indexed search engine. Having lacked proper maintenance since around 2004, however, the site went through a complete reimplementation, beginning in November 2005 and leaving private beta in August 2006. In 2007, the site moved onto dedicated hardware to cope with a sudden increase in popularity following these improvements.

Since 2006, the site has also provided a method of doing bulk downloads of archive files via BitTorrent.

Operations and quality control
Having moved from a sponsored, shared platform in 2007, the website currently resides on a dedicated server. As a result of the increased costs related to running on dedicated hardware, the site seeks the help of the community in covering the running costs.

Since anyone can upload files to the website, all uploaded files have to go through a manual screening process where they are checked for integrity and quality by site staff.

Reusing the tracker music files published on the website requires the song's author permission.

Mentions in publications
ModArchive was mentioned in the PC music freeware roundup in Sound on Sound magazine.

ModArchive (v3.1) was featured as Site of the Month in Computer Music magazine.

References

External links
 
 BitTorrent tracker

Demoscene
Internet properties established in 1996